Waldmann is a German surname meaning "forest man". Notable people with the surname include:

 Hans Waldmann (mayor) (1435–1489), mayor of Zurich and Swiss military leader
 Hans Waldmann (fighter pilot) (1922–1945), German former Luftwaffe fighter ace
Herman Waldmann (born 1945), British immunologist
Ludwig Waldmann (1913–1980), German physicist
Ralf Waldmann (1966–2018), Grand Prix motorcycle road racer

See also
 Waldman

German-language surnames
Jewish surnames